Coharie is the name for the Great Coharie Creek and its tributary the Little Coharie Creek, both in Sampson County, North Carolina. The Great Coharie Creek is a tributary of the Black River that joins the Cape Fear River that flows into the Atlantic Ocean.

Coharie also refers to the Coharie Formation, named for the creeks, a terrace and shoreline at about 215 feet above sea level on the mid- to southern East Coast.

The name Coharie was adopted by the Coharie Intra-tribal Council, Inc., a state-recognized tribe in North Carolina. The tribe claims "descent from certain tribes of Indians originally inhabiting the coastal regions of North Carolina." In 1910, residents of Herrings Township along the Coharie creeks identified as being of Croatan descent.

Etymology 
Coharie could be an Iroquoian, perhaps Tuscarora language, word that translates as driftwood.

References

Sampson County, North Carolina
Rivers of North Carolina
Names of places in the Americas